Wild Orchid II: Two Shades of Blue is a 1991 American drama romance film written and directed by Zalman King and starring Nina Siemaszko. It is an in-name only sequel to the 1989 film Wild Orchid.

Plot
Set in 1958 California, "Blue" McDonald (Nina Siemaszko) is a 16-year-old girl who travels from town to town with her father, "Ham" McDonald (Tom Skerritt) a drug-addicted jazz musician. One day, while passing through a small town, Blue meets a handsome young man named Josh Winslow (Brent David Fraser), who flirts with her on his way to church.

Blue and her father drive to Sacramento, where Ham gets a job at a jazz club owned by an old acquaintance of Ham's named Jules (Joe Dallesandro). After a show, Ham uses all the cash Jules pays him to buy heroin. When Ham attempts to quit using, he goes through withdrawal pains. Blue finds Jules and tells him that her father is sick from going through withdrawal, and Jules suggests Ham needs more heroin and offers to give her some in exchange for sex. Despite Blue never having sex in her life, she allows Jules to take her virginity. After she delivers the heroin to Ham, he gets angry after learning how she obtained it. He takes the heroin then gets behind the wheel of his car and dies in a car crash.

A few days later after Ham's funeral, a madam named Elle (Wendy Hughes), who used to know Ham, approaches Blue and offers her a job as a prostitute. Believing she has no other option now that her father is dead, Blue goes to the lavish mansion outside the city where Elle operates a high-end brothel where more than a dozen young women live and work. Elle forces Blue to strip naked in front of her and then coaches Blue in the art of seduction.

During her first days, Blue is befriended by Mona (Liane Curtis), a clever young woman who began prostituting herself at a young age and shows Blue how the work is done. Although Blue has a hard time containing her emotions with her first few clients, she learns how to remain calm as she plays the role of seductress. "Sully" Sullivan (Robert Davi), a rugged but kind-hearted middle-aged man who works for Elle as her driver, bodyguard and brothel bouncer, notices Blue becoming accustomed to the profession and warns that she will soon become hooked on the lifestyle.

One day, Josh (the young teenager Blue met earlier) along with his gruff father, Colonel Winslow (Stafford Morgan), show up at the brothel. Josh sheepishly tells the girls that his father has brought him there to lose his virginity. Blue dons a black wig and joins the group. Josh does not recognize her, and she leads him upstairs into her room where she seduces him and despite being nervous, he is unable to resist Blue (despite not recognizing her) and they have sex. 

Another day later, Blue partakes with other prostitutes in a bachelor party for wealthy client J.J. Clark (Don Broomfield). Irritated by J.J.'s arrogance, Blue strips in the middle of the party and taunts J.J. to do the same. Elle pulls Blue aside and warns her never to humiliate a client again or she will be physically harmed. Blue then declares she cannot remain a prostitute, but Elle refuses to let her go.

Later, Senator Dixon (Christopher McDonald), one of Blue's first clients, sends for her, and Sully drives her to Dixon's hotel. There, Blue is ambushed by Senator Dixon, a bodyguard, and two other men with a film camera and lights. Despite her protests, the cameraman films as a hood is placed over Blue's head, and she is handcuffed to the bed. Sully interrupts the stag film in progress. Senator Dixon draws a gun, but Sully overpowers him and escapes with Blue.

After Blue tells Sully about wanting to quit prostitution and start over, Sully gives her a bag full of over $5,000 in cash that he stole from Dixon's hotel room. Blue asks Sully if he would be interested in running away with her and he agrees. Blue and Sully settle in the same small town where Blue first saw Josh. They move in together in small house with Sully play-acting as Blue's father. Blue enrolls in a local high school where she makes new friends and begins dating Josh, who does not recognize her from the brothel.

A few weeks later, Elle locates Blue and shows up at the school, pretending to be Blue's mother. Elle privately approaches Blue and angrily explains to her that as a result of Blue running away, Elle was forced to compensate Senator Dixon the money that was stolen and also forced to use three of her girls to finish the stag film that the senator began filming. Ellen threatens Blue to return to Sacramento with her, but Elle calls her bluff.

The next evening, Blue goes to Josh's football game and consoles him when his team loses. Afterwards, Colonel Winslow beckons Josh, and Blue follows them to a building on campus where Elle awaits with a film projector. Winslow informs Josh he has bad news about Blue in which Elle screens the stag film, and Josh recognizes Blue's face onscreen. Blue bursts in, yells at them to turn off the film, and asks who any of them are to judge her. Josh follows her out, but she evades him. Elle tries to lure Blue back to the brothel by forcing Blue into her car for the drive back to Sacramento, but Sully chases after them and runs Elle's car off the road. Sully pulls Blue out of the backseat and after an armed standoff between him, Elle and Elle's new driver/bodyguard, Elle decides to let Blue and Sully go.

Some time later, Blue is still living with Sully as her fatherly protector and attending high school. In the final scene, Josh approaches Blue on her way to school where he admits he was disoriented when he discovered she had been a prostitute. However, he tells her he has always loved her, and they embrace.

Cast
 Nina Siemaszko as "Blue" McDonald 
 Wendy Hughes as Elle  
 Tom Skerritt as "Ham" McDonald 
 Robert Davi as "Sully" Sullivan 
 Brent David Fraser as Joshua Winslow 
 Christopher McDonald as Senator Dixon
 Joe Dallesandro as Jules
 Casey Sander as Captain Edwards 
 Stafford Morgan as Colonel Winslow
 Don Bloomfield as J.J. Clark
 Liane Curtis as Mona  
 Bridgit Ryan as Ruth
 Lydie Denier as Dominique
 Gloria Reuben as Celeste
 Victoria Mahoney as Mary
 Kathy Hartsell as Cathy 
 Lynn Gendron as Del  
 Frank Cavestani as Business Man  
 Monica Ekblad as Ida
 Ben Hartigan as Elderly Gentleman

References

External links

1991 films
1990s English-language films
1990s erotic films
American sequel films
Films directed by Zalman King
Films scored by George S. Clinton